Lightning McQueen's Racing Academy is a show attraction based on the Cars franchise in Sunset Boulevard at Disney's Hollywood Studios, which opened on March 31, 2019, as part of the park's 30th anniversary celebration.  The show takes place after the events of Cars 3.

The show is housed in Sunset Showcase Theater near Rock 'n' Roller Coaster Starring Aerosmith.

Show summary 
During the 10-minute show, guests take on the role of "rookie racer" as they enter the theater and watch a Lightning McQueen animatronic on stage. The audience is enveloped by a giant, wrap-around screen that is nearly two stories tall and stretches more than 200 feet from end to end.

Lightning is anxious to show what he's learned over the years. But his main rival Chick Hicks hacks into the simulator system to humiliate him, and he has to think fast to get back on course. Mater, Cruz Ramirez and Lightning's friends from Radiator Springs chime in with their support, as Lightning gears up for a challenge to settle the score with Chick Hicks in a virtual simulator race.

In the courtyard outside the attraction, guests can meet Cruz Ramirez and join DJ's Dance Party, relocated from Cars Land at Disney California Adventure.

References

External links 
 Official Website

Disney's Hollywood Studios
Pixar in amusement parks
Sunset Boulevard (Disney's Hollywood Studios)
Walt Disney Parks and Resorts entertainment
Audio-Animatronic attractions
2019 establishments in Florida
Cars (franchise)